Cristian Emilio Grabinski (born 12 January 1980 in Llavallol) is an Argentine football defender.

Career
Grabinski began his playing career with Newell's Old Boys, he made his league debut in a 1-1 draw with Talleres on 21 June 1999. He joined Racing Club from his local district of Avellaneda in 2003 where he played until 2006.

After a brief stint with Colón de Santa Fe Grabinski travelled to Europe to play for Cypriot side AEK Larnaca in 2007. He returned to South America in 2008 to play for Emelec of Ecuador before joining Chacarita Juniors in 2008.

In his first season with the club he helped them finish in 2nd place in the Argentine 2nd division and obtain promotion to the Primera División.

External links
 ESPN statistics 
 Argentine Primera statistics

1980 births
Living people
Argentine people of Polish descent
Sportspeople from Avellaneda
Argentine footballers
Argentina under-20 international footballers
Argentine expatriate footballers
Association football defenders
Newell's Old Boys footballers
Racing Club de Avellaneda footballers
Club Atlético Colón footballers
AEK Larnaca FC players
C.S. Emelec footballers
Deportes Iquique footballers
Chacarita Juniors footballers
San Martín de San Juan footballers
Chilean Primera División players
Argentine Primera División players
Expatriate footballers in Chile
Expatriate footballers in Cyprus
Expatriate footballers in Ecuador